

Premier League
 FC Armenicum, Karabakh Yerevan, Lori Vanadzor, and FC KotaykFC Armenicum were dissolved and yielded their place to the revived FC Pyunik.
 Newly established Dinamo-2000 Yerevan are allowed to participate in the premier league without competing in the Armenian First League first.
 On August 20, Araks Ararat FC was dissolved. The rights to participate in the Premier League were granted to the newly founded club Spartak Yerevan.
 Banants were relocated from the village of Kotayk to Yerevan. Despite not participating as a separate team in the 2000 Armenian First League, the club was also allowed to participate in the 2001 Armenian Premier League season.
 Kilikia did not pay entrance fee and refused to play twice, leading to their expulsion. At the end of the season they were also relegated along with Lori
Karabakh were relocated from Stepanakert to Yerevan.

Top goalscorers

First League
 Malatia and Kasakh returned to professional football.
 Armavir returned to professional football under the name Karmrakhayt Armavir.
 FC Gyumri changed their name back to Aragats FC.
 Pyunik-2 were added to the Armenian First League to make an 8-team competition.

First stage

Second stage
 Teams kept head-to-head results of preliminary stage in both groups.
 Tavush Ijevan withdrew before the start of the second stage

Promotion Group

Bottom Group

External links
 RSSSF: Armenia 2001